Llinos Golding, Baroness Golding (born 21 March 1933) is a Labour Party politician in the United Kingdom who currently sits in the House of Lords. She qualified as a radiographer and worked in the NHS, and is currently the Patron of the Society of Radiographers.

The daughter of MP Ness Edwards, Golding was the Member of Parliament (MP) for Newcastle-under-Lyme from 1986 to 2001, having replaced her husband John Golding. After stepping down at the 2001 general election, she was created a Life peer as Baroness Golding, of Newcastle-under-Lyme in the County of Staffordshire in the same year.

Baroness Golding was the peer who vouched for the two 'Fathers for Justice' protesters who threw a flour bomb at Prime Minister Tony Blair during Prime Minister's Questions on 19 May 2004. By vouching for them, Golding made it possible for the pair to access an area of the Commons viewing gallery not behind a glass security screen. There is no suggestion that she had any idea of their protest plans. Later the same afternoon, she apologised to the Houses of Lords and Commons for her part in the affair.

She is a board member of the Countryside Alliance, a pro-hunting organisation.

References

Bibliography

External links
 Lady Golding's Statement on the 19 May incident
 

1933 births
Living people
Ceramic and Allied Trades Union-sponsored MPs
Labour Party (UK) MPs for English constituencies
Labour Party (UK) life peers
Life peeresses created by Elizabeth II
Female members of the Parliament of the United Kingdom for English constituencies
UK MPs 1983–1987
UK MPs 1987–1992
UK MPs 1992–1997
UK MPs 1997–2001
Members of the Parliament of the United Kingdom for Newcastle-under-Lyme
20th-century British women politicians
21st-century British women politicians
20th-century English women
20th-century English people
21st-century English women
21st-century English people